Wings 3D is a free and open-source subdivision modeler inspired by Nendo and Mirai from Izware. Wings 3D is named after the winged-edge data structure it uses internally to store coordinate and adjacency data, and is commonly referred to by its users simply as Wings.

Wings 3D is available for Windows, Linux, and Mac OS X, using the Erlang environment.

Overview
Wings 3D can be used to model and texture low to mid-range polygon models. Wings does not support animations and has only basic OpenGL rendering facilities, although it can export to external rendering software such as POV-Ray and YafRay. Wings is often used in combination with other software, whereby models made in Wings are exported to applications more specialized in rendering and animation such as Blender.

Interface
Wings 3D uses context-sensitive menus as opposed to a highly graphical, icon-oriented interface. Modeling is done using the mouse and keyboard to select and modify different aspects of a model's geometry in four different selection modes: Vertex, Edge, Face and Body. Because of Wings's context-sensitive design, each selection mode has its own set of mesh tools. Many of these tools offer both basic and advanced uses, allowing users to specify vectors and points to change how a tool will affect their model. Wings also allows users to add textures and materials to models, and has built-in AutoUV mapping facilities.

Features
 A wide variety of Selection and Modeling Tools
 Modeling Tool support for Magnets and Vector Operations
 Customizable Hotkeys and Interface
 Tweak Mode lets you make quick adjustments to a mesh
 Assign and edit Lighting, Materials, Textures, and Vertex Colours
 AutoUV Mapping
 Ngon mesh support
 A Plugin Manager for adding and removing plugins
 Import and Export in many popular formats

Supported file formats
Wings loads and saves models in its own format (.wings), but also supports several standard 3D formats.

Import
 Nendo (.ndo)
 3D Studio (.3ds)
 Adobe Illustrator (.ai)
 Lightwave/Modo (.lwo/.lxo)
 Wavefront (.obj)
 PostScript (Inkscape) (.ps)
 Encapsulated PostScript (.eps)
 Stereolithography (.stl)
 Paths (.svg)

Export
 Nendo (.ndo)
 3D Studio (.3ds)
 Adobe Illustrator (.ai)
 BZFlag (.bzw)
 Kerkythea (.xml)
 Lightwave/Modo (.lwo/.lxo)
 Wavefront (.obj)
 POV-Ray (.pov)
 Cartoon Edges (.eps/.svg)
 Stereolithography (.stl)
 Renderware (.rwx)
 VRML 2.0 (.wrl)
 DirectX (.x)
 Collada (.dae)

See also

 Blender (software)
 3D modelling

References

External links

 
  (The old Wings 3D source code repository)
 The Wings 3D Official Development Forum (The best place to get help with Wings 3D)
 The OLD Wings 3D Forum
 Wings3d.es | The Spanish language Wings 3D Community
 Wings3d.de | The German language Wings 3D Community
 The Brazilian Portuguese language Wings 3D Community
 Wings 3D on the BeyondUnreal.com Wiki
 Video Tutorials in the YouTube wings3dchannel

3D graphics software
Free 3D graphics software
3D modeling software for Linux
Free computer-aided design software
Computer-aided design software for Linux
Erlang (programming language)
Free software that uses SDL
Free software programmed in Erlang